Bryon Lamont "Monte" Yoho (born March 26, 1952) is an American southern rock and country musician. He is best known as being a member of Outlaws and Blackhawk.

Early life
Yoho was born on March 26, 1952 in Lakeland, Florida. In 1965, when he was 13 years old, Yoho learned how to play the drums. Also in junior high school, he met future bandmate Hughie Thomasson and the two became close friends. Yoho and Thomasson later attended A.P. Leto High School in Tampa, Florida. In addition, Yoho was hired as a session musician in the late 1960s by the Darby, Florida-based band The Bellamy Brothers.

In 1969, Yoho met Billy Jones while hitchhiking back from the Atlanta Pop Festival. He had heard of Jones as a musician also living in the Tampa Bay area. While in the car, they discussed forming a band upon return to Tampa. The result was The Dave Graham Group, with Jones and Dave Graham on guitar, Roy Holly on bass, and Yoho on drums. The quartet frequently collaborated with Thomasson-led band known as The Outlaws.

The Outlaws

After several lineup changes and a breakup, Thomasson decided to reform The Outlaws in 1972. Thomasson became the lead vocalist and one of the three guitarists, Tampa folk singer Henry Paul joined as another guitarist, and Frank O'Keefe was the bassist. Jones was originally to play drums for the newest incarnation of the band. However, Thomasson was impressed by the Allman Brothers Band's usage of two lead guitarists and convinced Jones to occupy the third guitar slot. Yoho thus became the band's drummer.

The Outlaws developed a loyal following as they performed in many bars and clubs in the Tampa Bay area. While playing on a hillside for 2,000 college students in 1974, Charlie Brusco "discovered" the band and agreed to be their manager.

Discography

Studio albums
With The Outlaws
Outlaws (1975)
Lady in Waiting (1976)
Hurry Sundown (1977)
Playin' to Win (1978)
In the Eye of the Storm (1979)
It's About Pride (2012)

With The Henry Paul Band
Grey Ghost (1979)
Feel the Heat (1980)
Anytime (1981)

With BlackHawk
For the Sake of the Song (2009)

Live albums
With The Outlaws
Bring It Back Alive (1978)

References

Bibliography

1952 births
Living people
Musicians from Lakeland, Florida
Outlaws (band) members
Blackhawk (band) members